Zagradec may refer to: 

In Albania:
Zagradeci, a village in the Mala Prespa area, known as Заградец (Zagradec) in Macedonian

In Italy:
Sagrado di Sgonico, a frazione of Sgonico, known as Zagradec in Slovene

In Slovenia:
Zagradec, Ivančna Gorica, a settlement in the Municipality of Ivančna Gorica
Zagradec pri Grosupljem, a settlement in the Municipality of Grosuplje